The Doubs is a  river in far eastern France which strays into western Switzerland. It is a left-bank tributary of the Saône. It is the tenth-longest river in France.

The most populous settlement of the basin lies on its banks, Besançon. Its course includes a small waterfall and a  narrow lake.

Course
From its source in Mouthe it flows northeast: a few kilometers north of the French-Swiss border, then to form the border for less distance, about 40 km. North of the Swiss town of Saint-Ursanne it turns west then southwest. South-east of Montbéliard it adopts a southwest striation or fault of the Jura Mountains, flowing so over greater distance than the flow it has traced before.

The shape of the course resembles the silhouette of a terrier sitting upright, leaning right, with the upper part of a northeastern corner "ear" the only zone in Switzerland, there reaching Saint-Ursanne. In that country it borders or crosses the cantons Jura and Neuchâtel.

Waterfalls and lake
The falls known as the Saut du Doubs is on the French-Swiss border. 

The -high Doubs Falls are at the lake's end. The falls can be reached on foot or by passenger boat.

The Doubs flows through the following Departments of France, Cantons of Switzerland, and cities:

 Doubs (F): Pontarlier
 Neuchâtel (CH)
 Jura (CH): Saint-Ursanne
 Doubs (F): Montbéliard, Besançon
 Jura (F): Dole
 Saône-et-Loire (F): Verdun-sur-le-Doubs

Tributaries include:
 Loue
 Dessoubre
 Allan

The river forms several lakes:
 Lac de Saint-Point (elevation ) near Pontarlier
 Lac des Brenets (elevation )
 Lac de Moron (elevation )
 Lac de Biaufond (elevation )

Floods and seasonal variation
The rate of flow of the Doubs is very seasonally variable. The flooding or well-watered season can stretch from September to May, caused by heavy rains or by quick melting of snow from the Jura mountains.

In Besançon, the largest floods have been in 1852, in 1896 and in 1910.

Hydroelectricity

As a mountain river with substantial discharge, the Doubs has been used for electricity generation.

In popular culture 
The river is mentioned sixteen times in Stendhal's novel The Red and the Black (Le rouge et le noir).

See also 
 Nature parks in Switzerland
 January 1910 Doubs river flood

References

Rivers of Switzerland
Rivers of France
International rivers of Europe
 
Rivers of the canton of Jura
Rivers of the canton of Neuchâtel
Rivers of the Jura
Rivers of Bourgogne-Franche-Comté
Rivers of Doubs
Rivers of Jura (department)
Rivers of Saône-et-Loire
France–Switzerland border
Border rivers